Giromagny is a commune in the Territoire de Belfort department in Bourgogne-Franche-Comté in northeastern France.

Geography

Climate
Giromagny has a oceanic climate (Köppen climate classification Cfb).

Population

See also

Communes of the Territoire de Belfort department
Fort de Giromagny

References

External links
Official website 

Communes of the Territoire de Belfort